Victoria Trail is an arterial road  in northeast Edmonton, Alberta. It begins at the Yellowhead Trail interchange, then travels north through a number of neighborhoods, and currently ends at 153 Avenue. The City of Edmonton plans to expand the industrial area of Gorman northward, although it remains empty to this day.

History 
This road follows the path of a portion of a historic trail that ran from Fort Edmonton to Fort Victoria, known as "Victoria Trail" from the perspective of Edmontonians.  It was part of a larger trail system known as the Carlton Trail which ran east as far as Fort Garry (Winnipeg).

Nearby Fort Road is built on a different trail that also was part of the Carlton Trail network. Where Victoria Trail ends, at 153 Avenue, Fort Road is nearby.

Neighbourhoods
List of neighbourhoods Victoria Trail runs through. In order from south to north.
Canon Ridge
Overlanders
Kernohan
Belmont
Bannerman
Hairsine
Fraser
Kirkness

Major intersections
This is a list of major intersections, starting at the south end of Victoria Trail.

See also 

 Transportation in Edmonton
Victoria Settlement

References

Roads in Edmonton